Nedumpara Peak is one of the highest peak in the Western Ghats and is situated in Kollam district of Kerala, India, at an elevation of 900m. The peak is situated at Ambanad Hills near to Aryankavu. It is just 7 km away from Thenmala.

References

Mountains of Kerala
Geography of Kollam district
Mountains of the Western Ghats
Tourist attractions in Kollam district
Tourism in Kerala